The following list is a discography of production by DJ Paul, an American hip hop record producer and recording artist from Memphis, Tennessee. It includes a list of songs produced, co-produced and remixed by year, artist, album and title.

Albums produced

1994

Triple 6 Mafia – Smoked Out, Loced Out 

 All tracks (produced with Juicy J)

1995

Three 6 Mafia – Mystic Stylez 

 All tracks (produced with Juicy J)

1996

Kingpin Skinny Pimp – King of da Playaz Ball 

 All tracks (produced with Juicy J)

Kingpin Skinny Pimp – Skinny but Dangerous 

 All tracks (produced with Juicy J)

Gangsta Blac – Can it Be 

 All tracks (produced with Juicy J)

Three 6 Mafia – Chapter 1: The End 

 All tracks (produced with Juicy J)

1997

Three 6 Mafia – Chapter 2: World Domination 

 All tracks (produced with Juicy J)

1998

Prophet Posse – Body Parts 

 All tracks (produced with Juicy J)

Indo G – Angel Dust 

 All Tracks (produced with Juicy J)

The Kaze – Kamakazie Timez Up 

 All tracks (produced with Juicy J)

Gangsta Boo – Enquiring Minds 

 All tracks (produced with Juicy J)

1999

Project Pat – Ghetty Green 

 All Tracks (produced with Juicy J except track 12, produced by Mannie Fresh.)

Tear Da Club Up Thugs – CrazyNDaLazDayz 

 All Tracks (produced with Juicy J)
 14. "Hypnotize Cash Money" (produced with Juicy J and Mannie Fresh)

2000

Hypnotize Camp Posse – Three 6 Mafia Presents: Hypnotize Camp Posse 

 All Tracks (produced with Juicy J) except "Big Mouth, Big Talk"

Three 6 Mafia – When the Smoke Clears: Sixty 6, Sixty 1 

 All tracks (produced with Juicy J)

Triple Six Mafia –  Kings Of Memphis Underground Vol. 3 

 All Tracks (produced with Juicy J)

Funkmaster Flex – 60 Minutes Of Funk, Volume IV: The Mixtape 
 22. "Break Da Law 2001" (Project Pat and Three 6 Mafia)  (produced with Juicy J)

2001

Project Pat – Mista Don't Play: Everythangs Workin 

 All Tracks (produced with Juicy J)

Gangsta Boo – Both Worlds *69 

 All tracks (produced with Juicy J)

La Chat – Murder She Spoke 

 All Tracks (produced with Juicy J)

Three 6 Mafia – Choices: The Album 

 All Tracks (produced with Juicy J)

2002

DJ Paul – Underground Volume 16: For da Summa 

 All tracks

Project Pat – Layin' da Smack Down 

 All Tracks (produced with Juicy J)

Da Headbussaz – Dat's How It Happen to'M 

 All tracks (produced with Juicy J except track 10, produced by Fiend.)

2003

Lil Wyte – Doubt Me Now 

 All tracks (produced with Juicy J)

Frayser Boy – Gone on That Bay 

 All tracks (produced with Juicy J)

Project Pat – Mix Tape: The Appeal 

 All Tracks (produced with Juicy J)

Three 6 Mafia – Da Unbreakables 

 All tracks (produced with Juicy J)

Ludacris – Chicken-n-Beer 

 7. "Diamond in the Back" (produced with Juicy J)
 16. "We Got" (featuring Chingy, I-20 and 2 Chainz) (produced with Juicy J)

2004

Goodie Mob – One Monkey Don't Stop No Show 

 3. "123 Goodie" (produced with Juicy J)

Young Buck – Straight Outta Cashville 

 12. "Stomp" (featuring T.I. and Ludacris) (produced with Juicy J)
 13. "Taking Hits" (featuring D-Tay) (produced with Juicy J)

I-20 – Self Explanatory 

 8. "Hennessey & Hydro" (featuring Three 6 Mafia) (produced with Juicy J)

Lil Wyte – Phinally Phamous 

 All tracks (produced with Juicy J)

2005

Three 6 Mafia – Choices II: The Setup 

 All tracks (produced with Juicy J)

Three 6 Mafia – Most Known Unknown 

 All tracks (produced with Juicy J)

Mike Jones – Who Is Mike Jones? 

 5. "Got It Sewed Up" (Remix) (produced with Juicy J)

Paul Wall – The Peoples Champ 

 1. "I'm a Playa" (featuring Three 6 Mafia) (produced with Juicy J)

2006

DJ Kay Slay and Greg Street – The Champions: North Meets South 

 7. "Hood Drug Warz" (featuring B.G., Lil Wyte and Three 6 Mafia) (produced with Juicy J)

Blak Jak – Roll Da Dice 

 "Get Right Or Get Left"  (produced with Juicy J)

Crunchy Black – On My Own 

 All tracks (produced with Juicy J)

Lil Scrappy – Bred 2 Die, Born 2 Live 

 7. "Posted in the Club" (featuring Three 6 Mafia) (produced with Juicy J)

Project Pat – Crook by da Book: The Fed Story 

 All tracks (produced with Juicy J)

2007

Lil' Flip – I Need Mine 

 15. "I Just Wanna Tell U" (produced with Juicy J)
 28. "3, 2, 1, Go!" (featuring Three 6 Mafia) (produced with Juicy J)

Lil Wyte – The One and Only 

 All tracks (produced with Juicy J)

Crunchy Black – From Me to You 

 All tracks (produced with Juicy J)

UGK – Underground Kingz 

 2. "Int'l Players Anthem (I Choose You)"  (featuring OutKast) (produced with Juicy J)

Project Pat – Walkin' Bank Roll 

 All tracks (produced with Juicy J)

2008

Three 6 Mafia – Last 2 Walk 

 All tracks (produced with Juicy J)
 6. "I'd Rather" (featuring Unk) (produced with DJ Montay)
 7. "That's Right" (featuring Akon) (produced with Akon and Giorgio Tuinfort)
 16. "My Own Way" (featuring Good Charlotte) (produced with Dead Executives)
 21. "Lolli Lolli (Pop That Body)" (featuring Project Pat, Superpower & Young D) (produced with Superpower)
 22. "My Own Way (Remix)" (featuring Good Charlotte) (produced with Dead Executives)

2009

Project Pat – Real Recognize Real 

 All tracks (produced with Juicy J)

DJ Paul – Scale-A-Ton 

 All tracks

Lil Wyte – The Bad Influence 

 All tracks (produced with Juicy J)

Freddie Gibbs – Midwestgangstaboxframecadillacmuzik 

 15. "Just Tryin' ta Make It" (produced with Juicy J)

Lil B – 6 Kiss 

 22. "Smoke Trees Fxxx Hoes" (produced with Juicy J)

2011

SNO – Year Round 

 All tracks (produced with Juicy J)

Project Pat – Loud Pack 

 All tracks (produced with Juicy J)

2012

Lil B – God's Father 

 8. "Keep It 100" (produced with Juicy J)

DJ Paul – For I Have Sinned 

 5. "Buck Nah" (Remix)
 6. "Cocky" (featuring 2 Chainz) (produced with JGrxxn and Crazy Mike)
 7. "Da Money"
 8. "G'ed Up" (produced with Crazy Mike)
 9. "Hoe That Wouldn't Go"
 12. "Skull" (produced with JGrxxn and Crazy Mike)
 13. "Wildin" (featuring Kokoe)
 14. "WTF R Those"
 17. "Put That on my Hood" (produced with JGrxxn and Crazy Mike)
 19. "Go and Kill" (featuring Insane Clown Posse)
 22. "Smokin and Fuckin" (produced with JGrxxn and Crazy Mike)

Source:

Ya Boy – Trappy Birthday 

 6. "Rich Nigga Shit" (featuring Three 6 Mafia)

DJ Paul – A Person of Interest 

 All tracks 
 2. "I'm Dat Raw" (produced with Shawty Trap)
 3. "I Can't Take It" (featuring DJ Kay Slay) (produced with Shawty Trap)
 4. "Trap Back Jumpin'" (produced with Dream Drumz)
 5. "If I Want 2" (produced with Shawty Trap)
 6. "Get 'em Done" (produced with Shawty Trap)
 7. "Amnesia" (produced with Shawty Trap)
 8. "Had ta Eat" (featuring Aaron Williams)
 9. "All in da Family" (produced with Young Preach)
 10. "Chin Up" (produced with Dream Drumz)
 11. "Zeros & Commas" (produced with Gtown Vega)
 12. "Burn" (produced with Dream Drumz)
 13. "W.I.L.L." (featuring Gucci Mane) (produced with Dream Drumz)
 14. "Which One" (produced with Gtown Vega)
 15. "E&J" (featuring Locodunit) (produced with Shawty Trap)
 16. "Shut 'em Down" (produced with Shawty Trap)
 17. "No Panties" (produced with Gtown Vega)
 18. "Witha Shit" (featuring Locodunit) (produced with Shawty Trap and Premo D'Anger)
 19. "I'm There" (produced with JGrxxn)
 20. "Leggo" (produced with Shawty Trap)
 21. "In My Zone" (produced with JGrxxn and Premo D'Anger)
 22. "I'm Sprung" (featuring Lil Wyte) (produced with Dream Drumz)
 23. "My Best (My Pimpin)" (produced with JGrxxn and Premo D'Anger)
 24. "Brand New" (produced with Shawty Trap)
 27. "Re-Up" (featuring Project Pat) (produced with Dream Drumz)
 28. "King Shit" (produced with Shawty Trap)

2013

Ying Yang Twins – Twurk or Die 

 1. "Twurk or Die" (featuring Tone Bone)

DJ Paul and Drumma Boy – Clash of the Titans 

 4. "Muscle So Strong" (featuring Crunchy Black) (produced with Shawty Trap)
 7. "In and Out" (featuring Young Dolph) (produced with Shawty Trap)
 8. "Jump On Niggaz" (featuring Trae tha Truth) (produced with Shawty Trap)
 10. "Hard Shit" (featuring Lil Wyte)
 12. "No If Ands Or Buts (Feat. Baby D, Young Snead & Kokoe) (produced with Dream Drumz)
 14. "Million Dollars Richer" (produced with TWhy Xclusive)
 16. "In Da Trap" (featuring Gorilla Zoe) (produced with Shawty Trap)
 17. "Jus Becuz" (featuring MaxxPayne Shawty) (produced with Dream Drumz)
 18. "Tappin Out" (featuring Gangsta Boo) (produced with Dream Drumz)

Yelawolf and DJ Paul – Black Fall 

 All tracks (tracks 1–4 produced with TWhy Xclusive)

Da Mafia 6ix – 6ix Commandments 

 All tracks
 4. "Been Had Hard" (produced with TWhy Xclusive and JGrxxn)
 5. "Betta Pray" (featuring The Outlawz and Lil Wyte) (produced with TWhy Xclusive)
 7. "Murder On My Mind" (featuring SpaceGhostPurrp, Krayzie Bone, and Bizzy Bone) (produced with SpaceGhostPurrp and JGrxxn)
 10. "Yean High" (featuring 8Ball & MJG) (produced with TWhy Xclusive and JGrxxn)

2014

2 Chainz – FreeBase 

 4. "Flexin on My Baby Mama" (produced with TWhy Xclusive)

Killjoy Club – Reindeer Games 
(Tracks produced with TWhy Xclusive and FNA)
 2. "Don't Fuck Wit Me" (featuring Sugar Slam) 
 4. "Jump" (featuring Young Wicked and Sugar Slam) 
 6. "Hammer Time" (featuring Young Wicked)
 8. "It's a Murder It's a Kill" (featuring Young Wicked)
 10. "Devil Made Me Do It" (featuring Big Hoodoo) 
 12. "Braver Than Me" (featuring Young Wicked)
 14. "Live to Kill U"
 16. "Outro"

Da Mafia 6ix – Hear Sum Evil 

 All tracks
 2. "Who Want Sum Conflict" (featuring La Chat, YB The Rich Rocka and Locodunit) (produced with TWhy Xclusive and 808 Mafia)
 4. "Too Petty" (featuring Fiend, La Chat and Lil Wyte) (produced with TWhy Xclusive and JGrxxn)
 7. "Hydrocodone" (featuring Paul Wall and Charlie P) (produced with TWhy Xclusive and JGrxxn)
 8. "Active" (featuring Fiend and La Chat) (produced with TWhy Xclusive)
 11. "Payin' Top Dolla" (featuring Fiend and La Chat) (produced with TWhy Xclusive and The Outvaderz)

2015

Da Mafia 6ix – Watch What U Wish... 

 All tracks
 2. "Dat Ain't Inya" (featuring La Chat & Fiend) (produced with 808 Mafia)
 3. "50 Bands" (featuring Lord Infamous) (produced with TWhy Xclusive)
 6. "Why Must I Sweat Da Track" (featuring Fiend) (produced with TWhy Xclusive)
 10. "No Good Deed" (featuring La Chat) (produced with Hot Rod)
 11. "Back On Dat Hype" (featuring Lord Infamous) (produced with TWhy Xclusive)
 12. "Do Dabs" (featuring Mariah Jane) (produced with TWhy Xclusive)
 15. "High Like An Eagle" (featuring Lord Infamous, La Chat & Fiend) (produced with TWhy Xclusive)
 17. "We Be Goin' In" (featuring Lord Infamous) (produced with TWhy Xclusive)

DJ Paul – Master of Evil 

 All tracks
 2. "Down Bad" (produced with TWhy Xclusive)
 3. "I'm Just Sayin" (produced with TWhy Xclusive)
 5. "Dats It Fa Ya" (featuring Juicy J) (produced with TWhy Xclusive)
 7. "Play Witcha Life" (produced with TWhy Xclusive)
 8. "Goin in & Out" (produced with TWhy Xclusive)
 9. "She Rocks Dat" (produced with TWhy Xclusive)
 13. "Lay Down Today" (produced with TWhy Xclusive)
 14. "F U 2" (featuring Violent J and Yelawolf) (produced with TWhy Xclusive)
 17. "Shut It Down" (produced with TWhy Xclusive)
 18. "My Price is My Price" (produced with TWhy Xclusive)
 19. "Loud Loud" (featuring Lil Wyte) (produced with TWhy Xclusive)

2016

2 Chainz – Hibachi for Lunch 

 6. "Doors Open" (featuring Future) (produced with TWhy Xclusive)

2017

Riff Raff – Aquaberry Aquarius 

 9. "Jody Highroller Dot Com" (featuring Choo Johnson)

2018

Drake – Scorpion 

 11. "Talk Up" (featuring Jay-Z) (produced with TWhy Xclusive)

2019

Giggs – Big Bad 

 12. "Hold Up" (featuring French Montana) (produced with TWhy Xclusive)

Yelawolf – Trunk Muzik III 

 3. "Rowdy" (featuring Machine Gun Kelly & DJ Paul)
 7. "Trailer Park Hollywood"
 10. "Box Chevy 6" (featuring Rittz & DJ Paul)

Riff Raff – Cranberry Vampire 

 8. "Floor Seats" (featuring Chief Keef and DJ Paul)

Trippie Redd - A Love Letter to You 4 

 14. "Death" (featuring DaBaby) (produced with TWhy Xclusive)

2020

Duke Deuce – Memphis Massacre 2 

 3. "Crunk Ain't Dead [Remix]" (featuring Project Pat, Lil Jon, and Juicy J) (produced with Juicy J)

Lil Baby – My Turn 

 17. "Gang Signs" (produced with TWhy Xclusive)

Dave East – Karma 3 

 10. "Fuck Dat" (featuring Young Dolph)

2021

Yelawolf and DJ Paul – Slumafia 

 All tracks (produced with TWhy Xclusive)

Chief Keef – 4NEM 

 13. "Hadouken" (produced with Juicy J)

2022

The Game – Drillmatic – Heart vs. Mind 

 6. "O.P.P." (featuring YoungBoy Never Broke Again) (produced with TWhy Xclusive)
 8. "La La Land"

Freddie Gibbs – Soul Sold Separately 

 10. "PYS" (featuring DJ Paul)

References

See also 
Juicy J production discography

Discographies of American artists
Hip hop discographies
Production discographies